"Crocodile" is the 2nd episode of season one of Showtime TV series Dexter. The episode centers on the death of a police officer, Ricky Simmons, and the Miami Metro Police Department's attempt at bringing in the killer. In the meantime, Dexter stalks his next victim, Matt Chambers, a man who kills people by running them over while drunk.

Plot
Debra visits Dexter to talk about the Ice Truck Killer case. Afterwards, Dexter examines the Barbie doll the killer left in his apartment and realizes the hands have differently painted fingernails. After giving evidence at a trial, he enters another courtroom where Matt Chambers (Sam Trammell) is being tried for manslaughter after drunkenly running over a teenager with his car.

Dexter travels to a crime scene under the Westbound Causeway, where he notices a piece of human flesh in the victim's mouth. At the station, Debra tells Dexter about her new boyfriend Sean. They make plans to have a lunch date along with Dexter's girlfriend Rita. The causeway victim is discovered to be a police officer named Ricky Simmons. LaGuerta and Doakes go to his home, where they find his wife Kara injured but alive. While analysing the scene, Dexter finds a drop of blood that is not hers.

Dexter tells Rita about the lunch date. Debra calls to tell Dexter she has found a refrigerated truck with human fingertips inside, which have fingernails painted like the doll's. The bitten-off skin from Simmons' mouth is linked to Norberto Cervantes, who is apprehended by Doakes after Cervantes meets with drug lord Carlos Guerrero. Under questioning, Cervantes claims Kara was having an affair; Doakes punches him. LaGuerta takes a blood sample from Cervantes to confirm the skin and blood was his. Meanwhile, Chambers testifies that his car was stolen hours before the teenager's death and that he has been sober for several months.

Dexter and Detective Angel Batista find more of Cervantes' blood at Kara's home. Dexter obtains Chambers's fingerprint and discovers that he has killed people while driving drunk in other states. He prepares his kill room before going on the double date. When Rita notices the apparent ease of Debra and Sean's relationship, she starts to feel insecure and Dexter has difficulty comforting her. Cervantes is killed in jail by a man impersonating a police officer. Later, Rita and Dexter agree not to have sex until Rita is ready.

Debra learns she is being promoted to Homicide. LaGuerta informs Doakes that Kara has died of heart failure and forces him to admit that they were sleeping together, agreeing to keep the relationship secret so Doakes can remain on the case. Dexter sees Guerrero and contemplates killing him, but decides against it. He kidnaps Chambers, forces him to confess, then kills him and disposes of the body. At home, he finds evidence that the Ice Truck Killer has broken into his apartment for a second time.

Reception
"Crocodile" received mixed to positive reviews with much appraisal going to the opening sequence, which was first aired in this episode. IGN gave it a "Good" rating of 7.8, and stated that it was "...not as tightly constructed as the pilot, "Crocodile" still was solid and Michael C. Hall's performance as Dexter continues to be a wonderful one, deftly portraying all of the aspects of this complicated (to say the least) man, who has some unbelievable darkness hiding underneath his friendly exterior. And kudos to the excellent opening credits sequence, which consists of shots of Dexter going about several mundane activities that are made unsettling due to our knowledge that he's a serial killer".

TVSquad gave it a very positive review and said that "Two episodes in and I really can't say anything bad about this show. It's wonderful. You shouldn't feel satisfied after watching a show about this subject matter, but you do and that's because it's done well." and also praised the opening sequence for being "slick".

The review from DenofGeek was considerably worse however, with Sarah Dobbs summing up the episode by saying "Dexter goes on a double date, eats some doughnuts, and, oh yeah, kills some more people. Meanwhile, the writers go batshit insane and rattle through a million and one ideas at once."

The writer, Clyde Phillips was nominated for an Edgar Award for Best Television Episode Teleplay, but lost to Matthew Graham, writer of the first episode of the police drama Life on Mars.

References

External links

 

Dexter (TV series) episodes
2006 American television episodes
Television episodes directed by Michael Cuesta